The AI boom refers to a period of rapid and unprecedented development in the field of artificial intelligence, with the generative AI race being a key component of this boom, which began in earnest with the founding of OpenAI in 2016 or 2017.

OpenAI's generative AI systems, such as GPT (2018) and DALL-E (2021), have played a significant role in driving this development. In 2022, large language models were improved to where they could be used for chatbot applications; text-to-image-models were at a point where they were almost indiscernible from human-made imagery; and speech synthesis software was able to replicate human speech efficiently.

Language models 
GPT-3 is a large language model that was released in 2020 by OpenAI and is capable of generating high-quality human-like text that can be hard to determine whether it was hard to be written by a human or not. An upgraded version called GPT-3.5 was used in ChatGPT, which later garnered attention for its detailed responses and articulate answers across many domains of knowledge. A new version called GPT-4 was released on March 2023 and was used in the Microsoft Bing search engine. Other language models have been released such as LaMDA by Google and LLaMA by Meta Platforms.

In January 2023, DeepL Write, an AI-based tool to improve monolingual texts, was released.

Text-to-image models 
One of the first text-to-image models to capture widespread public attention was OpenAI's DALL-E, a transformer system announced in January 2021. A successor capable of generating more complex and realistic images, DALL-E 2, was unveiled in April 2022, followed by Stable Diffusion, an open source alternative, releasing in August 2022.

Following other text-to-image models, language model-powered text-to-video platforms such as DAMO, Make-A-Video, Imagen Video and Phenaki can generate video from text and/or text/image prompts.

Speech synthesis 
15.ai was one of the first publicly available speech synthesis software that allowed people to generate natural emotive high-fidelity text-to-speech voices from an assortment of fictional characters from a variety of media sources. It was first released on March 2020. ElevenLabs unveiled a website where users are able to upload voice samples to that allowed it to generate voices from them. The company was criticized after users were able to abuse its software to generate controversial statements in the vocal style of celebrities, public officials, and other famous individuals and raised concerns that it could be used to generate deepfakes that were more convincing.

References 

Artificial intelligence
Artificial intelligence stubs